Temple Adath Israel,  is a synagogue in Owensboro, Kentucky.  The Moorish Revival facade of the modest building features a gothic-arched door flanked by a pair of gothic-arched windows punctuated by four pilasters.  These are surmounted with molded capitals and fanciful embellishments and the whole is topped by a whimsical row of four, small, onion domed turrets.  The synagogue was built in 1877.

It is listed on the National Register of Historic Places.  It is among the oldest synagogue buildings still standing in the United States.

See also
Oldest synagogues in the United States

External links

Temple Adath Israel website
Illustration of Temple Adath Israel

References

Moorish Revival synagogues
Buildings and structures in Owensboro, Kentucky
Reform synagogues in Kentucky
Moorish Revival architecture in Kentucky
Synagogues completed in 1877
National Register of Historic Places in Daviess County, Kentucky
Synagogues on the National Register of Historic Places in Kentucky
1877 establishments in Kentucky